Shan County or Shanxian is a county in the southwest of Shandong province, China, bordering the provinces of Anhui to the southeast and Henan to the southwest. It is under the administration of the prefecture-level city of Heze.

Administrative divisions
As 2012, this County is divided to  4 subdistricts, 5 towns and 2 townships.
Subdistricts

Towns

Townships
 Gaolaojia Township
 Caozhuang Township

Climate

References

Counties of Shandong
Heze